In four-dimensional Euclidean geometry, the rectified tesseractic honeycomb is a uniform space-filling tessellation (or honeycomb) in Euclidean 4-space. It is constructed by a rectification of a tesseractic honeycomb which creates new vertices on the middle of all the original edges, rectifying the cells into rectified tesseracts, and adding new 16-cell facets at the original vertices. Its vertex figure is an octahedral prism, {3,4}×{}.

It is also called a quarter tesseractic honeycomb since it has half the vertices of the 4-demicubic honeycomb, and a quarter of the vertices of a tesseractic honeycomb.

Related honeycombs

See also 
Regular and uniform honeycombs in 4-space:
Tesseractic honeycomb
Demitesseractic honeycomb
24-cell honeycomb
Truncated 24-cell honeycomb
Snub 24-cell honeycomb
 5-cell honeycomb
 Truncated 5-cell honeycomb
 Omnitruncated 5-cell honeycomb

Notes

References 
 Kaleidoscopes: Selected Writings of H. S. M. Coxeter, edited by F. Arthur Sherk, Peter McMullen, Anthony C. Thompson, Asia Ivic Weiss, Wiley-Interscience Publication, 1995,  
 (Paper 24) H.S.M. Coxeter, Regular and Semi-Regular Polytopes III, [Math. Zeit. 200 (1988) 3-45] See p318 
 George Olshevsky, Uniform Panoploid Tetracombs, Manuscript (2006) (Complete list of 11 convex uniform tilings, 28 convex uniform honeycombs, and 143 convex uniform tetracombs)
  o4x3o3o4o, o3o3o *b3x4o, x3o3x *b3o4o, x3o3x *b3o *b3o - rittit - O87
 

Honeycombs (geometry)
5-polytopes